Jason Whittle (born March 7, 1975) is a former American football guard. He went to high school in Camdenton, Missouri and played for the Camdenton Lakers.  He spent four years at Southwest Missouri State University (now Missouri State University playing college football for the Bears where, in 1995, he won the Arthur Briggs Award for being an outstanding scholar athlete.  He was an American football offensive lineman last playing for the Buffalo Bills.  He was originally signed by the New York Giants as an undrafted free agent in 1998.  He was part of New York Giants teams that won two NFC East titles in 2000 and 2005, and the NFC Championship in 2000.  He played 11 years in the NFL as a Guard and Center.  He is currently co-owner/broker of RE/MAX Lake of the Ozarks one of the top RE/MAX brokerages in the midstates region.  He currently resides at Lake of the Ozarks in Missouri, with his wife Natalie and 6 children.

See also
History of the New York Giants (1994-present)

References

1975 births
Living people
Sportspeople from Springfield, Missouri
American football offensive guards
New York Giants players
Tampa Bay Buccaneers players
Minnesota Vikings players
Buffalo Bills players
Missouri State University alumni